The third season of M*A*S*H aired Tuesdays at 8:30–9:00 pm on CBS.

Cast

Recurring roles:

† First season as a recurring player
‡ Last season as a recurring player

Episodes

Notes

References

External links 

 List of M*A*S*H (season 3) episodes at the Internet Movie Database

M*A*S*H
M*A*S*H
MASH 03